Kilinjalgal is a 1981 Indian Tamil-language romance film, written and directed by Durai. The film stars Mohan, Poornima Bhagyaraj and Dilip. It revolves around two lovers whose romance is opposed by their families due to differences in religion.

Kilinjalgal was released on 25 December 1981. The film was a silver jubilee hit and ran for 175 days at the box office.

Plot 

Babu, a Hindu, falls in love with Julie, a Christian. However, both the families are against this love due to differences in religion. Despite heavy opposition, both Babu and Julie and remain adamant in their decision. Julie's father Stephen locks her in a room while Babu's father Manikkam also does not permit him to move out of his home. To everyone's shock, Julie commits suicide. Hearing this, Babu rushes to the crematorium and dies when Julie's corpse is being cremated.

Cast 

Mohan as Babu
Poornima Bhagyaraj as Julie
Dilip as Jana
V. K. Ramasamy as Station master
V. Gopalakrishnan as Stephen
Bayilvan Ranganathan
G. Srinivasan as Manikkam
Gokulnath as Church Father
Rajavelu as Inspector
Sukumari as Stella
S. N. Parvathy as Uma's mother
Vanchiyoor Radha as Babu's mother
Poornima (credited as Sudha) as Usha
Senthil
Jolly Abraham in Guest appearance

Soundtrack 
The music was composed by T. Rajendar who also wrote the lyrics. The song "Vizhigal Medaiyam" is set in Revati raga.

Release and reception 
Kilinjalgal was released on 25 December 1981. Nalini Sastry of Kalki called the story outdated. The film was a silver jubilee hit and ran for 175 days at the box office.

References

External links 
 

1980s romance films
1980s Tamil-language films
1981 films
Films directed by Durai
Films scored by T. Rajendar
Indian interfaith romance films
Indian romance films